[[File:Gem-Grave-OpenTopo.jpg|275px|thumb|Map of the former municipality of Grave, 2015]]

Grave (formerly De Graaf'') is a city and former municipality in the Dutch province of North Brabant. Grave is a member of the Dutch Association of Fortified Cities.

The former municipality included the following towns : Grave (capital), Velp, Escharen and Gassel.

Grave, Boxmeer, Cuijk, Mill en Sint Hubert, and Sint Anthonis merged into the new municipality of Land van Cuijk on 1 January 2022.

History 

Grave received city rights in 1233.

The former municipality of Grave was formed in the Napoleonic era (1810) and coincided with the fortified Grave and immediate surroundings. The history of the town was thus linked to that of the place.

This changed in 1942. Then there was a reclassification place where the municipality Grave was expanded with the previously independent municipalities Velp and Escharen. Moreover, in 1994 the neighboring municipality of Beers was abolished and a part thereof, the parish Gassel, was also added to the municipality Grave.

Popular attractions 
Near to Grave lies a bridge, now called John S. Thompsonbrug, built in 1929. It is the northern connection to Gelderland, spanning the river Maas. The bridge was one of the key strategic points in Operation Market Garden; the city was liberated at 17 September 1944, but suffered very little damage. The bridge was named in 2004 after Lieutenant John S. Thompson who commanded the platoon  of the 82nd Airborne Division that captured the bridge.

The Hampoort is the old entrance to the city, and it is still largely intact and can be visited.

Notable people

Nobility 
 Mary of Guelders (ca.1434 in Grave – 1463), the queen consort of Scotland as the wife of King James II of Scotland, served as regent of Scotland from 1460 to 1463
 Adolf, Duke of Guelders  (1438 in Grave – 1477) a Duke of Guelders & Count of Zutphen 1465–1471
 Charles II, Duke of Guelders (1467 in Grave – 1538) a member of the House of Egmond who ruled as Duke of Guelders and Count of Zutphen from 1492-1538
 Anna van Egmont (1533 in Grave – 1558) a wealthy Dutch heiress, the first wife of William the Silent, Prince of Orange
 Louise van der Nooth (1630s in Grave – 1654) a maid of honour and favorite of Queen Christina of Sweden

and 
 Johann Weyer (1515 in Grave – 1588) a Dutch physician, occultist and demonologist, disciple and follower of Heinrich Cornelius Agrippa
 Charles de Thierry (1793 in Grave – 1864) an adventurer in New Zealand
 Jan Pieter van Suchtelen (1751 in Grave – 1836) a general in the Russian army during the Russo-Swedish War (1808–1809) 
 Johan Stein (1871 in Grave – 1951) a Dutch astronomer and a member of the Society of Jesus

Images

See also 
 Apostolic Vicariate of Grave–Nijmegen, former Catholic pre-diocesan jurisdiction

References

External links 

 
 Official website

Cities in the Netherlands
Populated places in North Brabant
Former municipalities of North Brabant
Municipalities of the Netherlands disestablished in 2022
Geography of Land van Cuijk
Rivers with fish ladders